Eucereon consorta is a moth of the subfamily Arctiinae. It was described by Schaus in 1910. It is found in Costa Rica and Peru.

References

consorta
Moths described in 1910